Richard Toll Airport  is an airport serving Richard Toll, a town in the Saint-Louis Region in northern Senegal.

References

 Google Maps

External links
 

Airports in Senegal
Saint-Louis Region